Andrew A. Croft (born 1965) is a retired United States Air Force lieutenant general who served as the military deputy commander of United States Southern Command from 2021 to 2023. Croft was commissioned through the ROTC program at University of California, Los Angeles in 1988.

In July 2020, the United States Senate confirmed his promotion to lieutenant general and nomination to become the military deputy commander of the United States Southern Command, replacing Lieutenant General Michael T. Plehn.

Croft retired from the Air Force on February 25, 2023.

Awards and decorations

Effective dates of promotions

References

1965 births
Living people
Place of birth missing (living people)
University of California, Los Angeles alumni
Embry–Riddle Aeronautical University alumni
Air University (United States Air Force) alumni
Naval War College alumni
United States Air Force generals
Lieutenant generals
Recipients of the Defense Superior Service Medal
Recipients of the Legion of Merit